Karl Bierwirth (24 September 1907 – 3 May 1955) was a German male weightlifter, who competed in the Light-Heavyweight category and represented Germany at international competitions.  He competed at the 1928 Summer Olympics.

References

1955 deaths

Weightlifters at the 1928 Summer Olympics

1907 births
German male weightlifters
Olympic weightlifters of Germany
Sportspeople from Essen
20th-century German people